James Dabbs may refer to:
 James M. Dabbs Jr. (1937–2004), social psychologist and professor of psychology
 James McBride Dabbs (1896–1970), American author and farmer